Christoph Moritz Max Freiherr von Beschwitz (Schloss Arnsdorf, 2 April 1898 – Wiesbaden, 26 September 1980), Lord of the Castle of Arnsdorf in the Kingdom of Saxony, was a German Nobleman, son of Heinrich Moritz Max Freiherr von Beschwitz and wife Alexandra Emilie Caroline Eugenie Henriette Adele Gräfin Zedtwitz von Moraván und Duppau.

Career
He was a Knight of Honour of the Order of St. John.

Marriage and children
He married firstly in Schloss Suckow on 7 October 1924 Marie Agnes von Arnim (Schloss Suchow, 19 August 1903 – Dresder Weissen-Hirsch, 3 May 1938), daughter of Georg Gustav von Arnim and wife Hulda Elisabeth Anna von Versen, and had issue, among whom a daughter Verena Marie Agnes Hulda Alexandra Freiin von Beschwitz (Dresden, 13 October 1928 – Wiesbaden, 22 April 1980), married as his first wife at the Roça Canzela, in Quiculungo, Angola, on 9 October 1960 with Dom Miguel Nuno de Sousa Coutinho (Évora, São Pedro, 7 March 1930 –), of the Marquesses (formerly Counts) of Funchal and Marquesses (formerly Viscounts) of Maceió in Brasil.

References

1898 births
1980 deaths
Barons of Germany